The Grunsky-Burton Open Meeting Act was enacted by the California Legislature in 1973.  It became Section 9027 of the Government Code.  It provided that all meetings of the Senate and Assembly and the committees, subcommittees and conference committees were to be "conducted openly" so that the public may remain informed.

Repeal
That section was repealed in 1984 and replaced with Section 9926 of the Legislative Reform Act of 1983. In 1989, those provisions were repealed and replaced with similar provisions which can be found again at Sections 9027 through 9031, inclusive, of the Government Code.

See also
Freedom of information law (California)

California statutes
1973 in law
1973 in California